Strangers of the Night is a 1923 American silent comedy film directed by Fred Niblo. It was produced by Louis B. Mayer and released through Metro Pictures.

The film was adapted by C. Gardner Sullivan from the 1921 stage play, Captain Applejack, by Walter C. Hackett, which on Broadway had starred Wallace Eddinger. It was remade as a talkie by Warner Brothers in 1931 under the Captain Applejack title. The 1923 film is now lost.

Cast
 Matt Moore as Ambrose Applejohn
 Enid Bennett as Poppy Faire
 Barbara La Marr as Anna Valeska
 Robert McKim as Borolsky
 Mathilde Brundage as Mrs. Whatcombe
 Emily Fitzroy as Mrs. Pengard
 Otto Hoffman as Horace Pengard
 Tom Ricketts as Lush (as Thomas Ricketts)

References

External links

1923 films
1923 comedy films
Silent American comedy films
American silent feature films
American black-and-white films
Films directed by Fred Niblo
American films based on plays
Films based on adaptations
Lost American films
Films produced by Louis B. Mayer
Metro Pictures films
1923 lost films
Lost comedy films
1920s American films